Lithospermum is a genus of plants belonging to the family Boraginaceae. The genus is distributed nearly worldwide, but most are native to the Americas and the center of diversity is in the southwestern United States and Mexico. Species are known generally as gromwells or stoneseeds.

Taxonomy
There are about 50, to 60 species in the genus.

Some species, such as Lithospermum arvense, are sometimes classified in the genus Buglossoides, but that genus is subsumed into Lithospermum by works such as the Flora of China. In addition, a 2009 molecular study showed that the genus Onosmodium should be included within Lithospermum.

Species include:

Lithospermum arvense (syn. Buglossoides arvensis) – field gromwell, corn gromwell
Lithospermum azuayensis 
Lithospermum bejariense – western marbleseed
Lithospermum bolivariensis
Lithospermum californicum – California stoneseed
Lithospermum calycosum – Chinati stoneseed
Lithospermum canescens – hoary puccoon, Indian-paint
Lithospermum caroliniense – Carolina gromwell, hairy puccoon
Lithospermum cobrense – smooththroat stoneseed
Lithospermum confine – Arizona stoneseed
Lithospermum cuzcoensis
Lithospermum erythrorhizon – purple gromwell, red-root gromwell, 紫草 zicao (Pinyin: zǐcǎo), 紫草 murasaki･sō (Japanese)
Lithospermum hancockianum
Lithospermum incisum – narrowleaf stoneseed, fringed gromwell
Lithospermum latifolium – American stoneseed
Lithospermum leymebambensis
Lithospermum macbridei
Lithospermum matamorense – rough stoneseed
Lithospermum mirabile – San Antonio stoneseed
Lithospermum molle – softhair marbleseed
Lithospermum multiflorum – manyflowered stoneseed
Lithospermum obtusifolium – roundleaf stoneseed
Lithospermum officinale – common gromwell, European stoneseed
Lithospermum parksii – Parks' stoneseed
Lithospermum parviflorum – eastern prairie marbleseed
Lithospermum purpurocaeruleum (syn. Buglossoides purpurocaerulea) – purple gromwell
Lithospermum rodriguezii
Lithospermum ruderale – western stoneseed, Columbia puccoon, wayside gromwell, whiteweed
Lithospermum tuberosum – southern stoneseed, tuberous gromwell
Lithospermum viride – green stoneseed

Ecology
Lithospermum leaves are eaten by the caterpillars of certain Lepidoptera, such as the moth Ethmia pusiella which has been recorded on L. officinale.

Uses
The dried root of Lithospermum erythrorhizon is a Chinese herbal medicine with various antiviral and biological activities, including inhibition of human immunodeficiency virus type 1 (HIV-1). Lithospermum erythrorhizon is native to Japan, where it has been traditionally used to make a purple dye. In southwestern North America, a species of this genus was used as a contraceptive by the Shoshone Native American tribe.

Fossil record
7 petrified nutlets and nutlet fragments of a Lithospermum species have been described from the Late Miocene Ash Hollow Formation, Ogallala Group, five km south of Martin in Bennett County, South Dakota. †Lithospermum dakotense sp. nov. shows similarities in size, shape, attachment and epidermal cell patterns to extant Lithospermum species. The fossil nutlets were preserved in various stages of maturity. The fossils closely resemble the nutlets of Lithospermum caroliniense and Lithospermum incisum.

References

External links 
 

 
Boraginaceae genera